Honduran Lenca is a poorly attested language that was spoken with minor dialect differences in Intibuca, Opatoro, Guajiquiro (Huajiquiro), Similatón (modern Cabañas), and Santa Elena.

Phonology

Consonants 

 Stops /p, t, k/ in word-medial and word-final positions may occasionally be heard as voiced [b, d, ɡ]. /p, k/ may also be fricated as [β, ɣ] in these positions as well.
 /n/ can be heard as velar  when preceding /k/.
 /p, k/ in word-final position may also occasionally be pronounced as [f, h].

Vowels

References

Lencan languages
Extinct languages of North America
Languages extinct in the 1970s
Languages of Honduras